Vusi Simon Mthimkhulu Ncogo (born 23 January 1986), is a South African football (soccer) defender who currently plays for Polokwane City in the Premier Soccer League.

References

External links

1986 births
Living people
Association football defenders
South African soccer players
Thanda Royal Zulu F.C. players
Polokwane City F.C. players
Witbank Spurs F.C. players